Philip Leakey (born 21 June 1949 in Nairobi) is a former Kenyan politician. He was the first White member of the Kenyan Parliament since independence.

Career
Leakey represented the KANU party led by then president Daniel Arap Moi. He was an MP of Langata Constituency from 1979  and served as a cabinet minister for a short stint. He lost his parliamentary seat in the 1992 Kenyan general elections, the first multiparty elections in Kenya, when Raila Odinga won the Langata seat.

Together with his wife Katy Leakey, he runs The Leakey Collection, a company exporting products made by Maasai handicrafts.

His parents are Louis and Mary Leakey, both famous paleontologists. Philip is brother to Richard and Jonathan Leakey, and half-brother to Colin Leakey. His children by his second wife, Valerie Fraser Leakey, are Lara Fraser Leakey, Kyela Fraser Leakey,  and Tiana Fraser Leakey.  He was educated at Lenana School, Nairobi (formerly the Duke of York School).

Position in the Leakey family

References
The Leakey Collection

1949 births
Living people
Leakey family
Kenyan people of British descent
Kenyan people of English descent
Kenya African National Union politicians
Members of the National Assembly (Kenya)
Government ministers of Kenya
White Kenyan people
People educated at Leighton Park School